Charles Lichty Miller (born December 1, 1887) was an American college football player and coach at Haverford College in Haverford, Pennsylvania.

References

1887 births
Year of death missing
Haverford Fords football coaches
Haverford Fords football players
Sportspeople from Lancaster, Pennsylvania